Gerard Byrne (born 29 March 1958, in Dublin) is an Irish figurative painter. His artwork encompasses various themes from landscapes and architecture painted both in his native Ireland and on foreign travels, through still life to the floral and figurative works.

Biography

Early years
Gerard Byrne was born in Finglas, Dublin, Ireland to parents Brendan and Kathleen. His father worked for many years as a self-employed customs agent, while his mother "Kay" reared the family of six: Brendan, Miriam, Gerard, Pauline, Janette and Irene. He attended the Sacred Heart school in Glasnevin, then the City Quay School and the St Kevin's Christian Brothers in Ballygall. Unrecognised and untreated dyslexia prevented him from making the most out of the school education. However his artistic talents had been recognised, and from an early age he was encouraged to draw. He wanted to enter the art college but was too young at the time to be accepted. At the age of 14 he left school and got his first job at Clery's, a landmark department store on O'Connell Street, where he worked as a lift boy for 4 years.

Byrne made an attempt to enter an art college but not having sufficient qualifications he got refused. Following his parents' advice to get a "real job" he started an apprenticeship as an electrician. It led him to obtain his dream job: a lighthouse technician. Between 1978 and 1982 he mastered the trade but the innate curiosity made him move on in his life. He decided to leave a well paid pensionable post and in 1982 together with his best friend Fran organised a road trip to Australia in a vintage Volkswagen camper van. The two travelled across Europe but got stuck in Turkey when the visas to Iran had been refused due to the Iran–Iraq War. They made their way to Athens, sold the van in Greece and took a plane to Australia. The two hitchhiked around the continent and made their way to Darwin where both got jobs as flying electricians installing generators in aboriginal settlements. From Australia Gerard made his way back home via Asia, travelling through Indonesia, Burma, India and Russia mostly by train and then flew back from Moscow.

Towards life as an artist
Back in Dublin, Byrne continued working as an electrician taking various day time jobs. The longing to be a painter became predominant though. Gradually he developed an idea to leave the recession hit Ireland and travel to America to earn some money. His plan was to purchase an inexpensive house in an inner city and focus on becoming a full-time artist. Very determined to make his dream come true Gerard left for New York and worked tirelessly as an electrician for about two years. Upon his return to Dublin he spent all his savings on a cheap flat in the Liberties. Committed to sticking to his plan he led a humble life and focused on drawing and painting. He would mostly spend time in the local market, painting the people and the local scenes. Gerard befriended local traders, who were supportive of his art and even fed him, often leaving boxes of fresh fruit and vegetables on his doorstep. Finding it hard to support himself he took an electrician job again. However an electric shock that nearly killed him had a sobering effect. It made him fully realise that his true life ambition was to be an artist. By chance he saw a documentary on the forthcoming changes in East Berlin and felt a strong need to be there to experience it. He decided to leave Ireland again.

Making it happen
In early 1989 Gerard packed his paint and canvas into an old camper van and left for Germany. Passing through Checkpoint Charlie in East Berlin he encountered the underground movement whose member had offered him to become an Artist-in-Residence. It was a major breakthrough, Byrne became a full-time artist. A few months later, in November 1989 the Berlin Wall came down. Seven months of working in the streets of Berlin, painting the local scenes and architecture resulted in a solo show of his works. An exhibition was organised under cover in a deteriorated, disused supermarket transformed for three weeks into an aesthetically pleasing art gallery called the People's Gallery. Although the theme of works was not politically charged the event itself was an act of freedom, a statement of the love of art and against the state interfering in the freedom of expression. Gerard stayed in Berlin through the unification process and shared the liberation experience with his new German friends.

Art

Life as an artist
Upon a return to Ireland Gerard exhibited his Berlin artwork in the George Gallery in Dublin followed by the regular expositions in other Dublin galleries. He returned to America, this time with the sole purpose of painting. In New York he got cheap accommodation in the Spanish Harlem, a rough part of the city where he was the only white European and believed by the neighbours to be a cop under cover. When he came back to Dublin his New York work was presented in the Jo Rain Gallery. In 1996 he exhibited in the Harrison Gallery and took over the running of the gallery for the period of 2 years. Although very successful in managing it he realised he needed to decide whether he wanted to be a gallery owner or an artist creating his art. Once again he made a conscious decision to stick to the idea of being an artist.

In 2003 a relationship with the mother of his daughter Clara broke and he travelled to Dingle, the West Coast of Ireland to find solitude and much needed inspiration. He stayed for a period of 3 months painting seascapes of Dingle Peninsula and Great Blasket Island and preparing for the group exhibition in Greenlane Gallery, Dingle to commemorate 50th anniversary of the last man leaving Great Blasket Island. As a result of his break up Gerard lost his only recently renovated home and studio in Sandycove. Shortly after he was offered by a complete stranger a basement to stay and work in a house in Killiney. To his great surprise it happened to be a house with a sea view capturing his much loved Sorrento. He stayed there for three years. Over a short period of time Gerard became close friends with the owner of the house, John.
In 2005 Gerard made a painting trip to India and shortly after again to America. When he came home he focused on painting his beloved local Irish scenes: Dalkey, Killiney, Sorrento, Sandycove. His inspiration was fed by the beauty of the coast line, sea, light, local architecture and life. He became known as a local painter.
In October 2007 Gerard flew to the USA once again, rented a camper van and drove upstate New York. He spent 6 weeks on the road capturing the colours of the fall. He came back with a number of big format pictures depicting the autumnal landscapes.
In 2005 he bought a house in Dalkey, with the idea of having a home to celebrate the arts, where music nights, poetry readings, classical music events, jazz concerts would complement his life as a painter. In time his home grew to become a gallery and was named The Art House. It became a recognised spot on the map of Dalkey, a place where the creative vibe dominated the structure of the house, run not for profit but for love of art, something he had learnt in Berlin a decade before.
The Art House was situated in the heart of Dalkey village, directly opposite a well known pub called Finnegan's which is featured in a number of Gerrard's paintings. It is here where in 2008 he met his future wife Agata, a Polish garden designer who was working as a waitress at the time.
In August 2013 the artist opened The Gerard Byrne Studio in Dalkey hosting the reception of his wedding the following month. The gallery presented the artworks created over the previous years.

Life in Britain
In October 2014 Gerard moved to London and marked his arrival with a solo exhibition celebrating the opening of the Gerard Byrne Studio in Clerkenwell. His work focused on painting London landmarks en plein air and the new studio works. In October 2015 Gerard and Agata's move to Brighton provided the artist with an opportunity to capture the diminishing sea town architecture of the Victorian era, West Pier, Brighton Palace Pier and the beauty of the coastal line. His studio work advanced towards floral and industrial abstract. With little to distract him, this was a prolific period of artistic activity for Gerard, as he was able to focus entirely on his painting. In May 2016 he contributed to the Artists Open Houses Festival, where more than 1,000 artists exhibited their work in venues across Brighton and Hove and in the surrounding areas. In July 2016, Gerard came second place in the 'professional artists' category at Pintar Rapido London, the UK's biggest plein air painting festival and competition. Later that year, in December, he participated in the Focus LDN 2016 Winter Exhibition at The Menier Gallery in Southwark, London. The exhibition featured 28 contemporary artists, working in a range of media, including painting, embroidery and photography. In June 2017, Gerard was selected out of over a thousand artists to participate in the Sky Arts Landscape Artist of the Year competition, held at Knaresborough Castle in Yorkshire. In July of the same year, he has been invited to participate as a guest artist in 2017's Pintar Rapido in Chelsea, London.

Return to Dublin and Gerard's Botanical Escape
While still living in London, in November 2017 Gerard established his new art gallery in Ireland, Gerard Byrne Studio Ranelagh, Dublin. In April 2018, Gerard launched his solo exhibition ‘Time is the Enemy’  at Gerard Byrne Studio in Ranelagh. ‘Time is the Enemy’ combined a mix of floral, architectural, landscape and figurative works, proving the unsurpassed versatility of Gerard's painting. The collection of works offered a subtle exploration of the theme of the passing time. In June of that same year, Gerard and his wife Agata relocated from London back to Dublin. Same week Byrne celebrated 30 years of painting outdoors at the National Botanic Gardens (Ireland) in Dublin, in an exhibition entitled ‘Inside Outside & Beyond’. The exhibition was organised in collaboration with the Office of Public Works, and hosted at the National Botanic Gardens’ gallery space.

Following the success of 2018's ‘Inside Outside & Beyond’ exhibition, Ireland's Ambassador to Singapore, Patrick Bourne along with Dr Nigel Taylor, the Group Director of Singapore Botanic Gardens invited Gerard Byrne to take up Artist-in-Residence in the Gardens from August till September 2019. His trip was supported by the Department of Foreign Affairs (Ireland). Gerard's residency resulted in a new collection of plein air paintings that paid homage to the lush foliage of Southeast Asia. This collection formed the basis of an exhibition co-hosted by the Singapore Botanic Gardens and the Irish Embassy in Singapore. Alongside Gerard's paintings from Singapore, the exhibition ‘Botanical Fusion’ featured his botanical works from the National Botanic Gardens of Ireland and London's Kew Gardens. The exhibition ran for a period of ten weeks at the People's Gallery in the Singapore Botanic Gardens with works on display in the open-air exhibition areas near the Tanglin, Nassim and Bukit Timah gates of the Gardens. Seen by over 50,000 visitors to the Gardens the exhibition was a part of the commemorative celebration of the Singapore Botanic Gardens' 160 years in existence. Moreover, it formed part of the Government's 2025 Asia Pacific Strategy to increase Ireland's visibility in the Asia Pacific region.
In early 2020, the highly anticipated 'Botanical Fusion' collection created during Byrne's Artist-in-Residence at the Singapore Botanic Gardens made its way to Dublin. The collection of artworks was launched by Mr Ron Bolger, Honorary Consul-General of Singapore in Ireland on 27 February  at the Gerard Byrne Studio as 'Botanical Fusion. Singapore to Dublin' exhibition. The collection of 42 artworks was widely praised. According to Patrick Bourne, Irish Ambassador to Singapore; "The new works that Gerard produced during his time as Artist-in-Residence at the Singapore Gardens are extraordinary and represent a unique rendering of the colour and atmosphere of this tropical place through the prism of a great Irish eye and talent." Due to the introduction of the Government restrictions as a result of the COVID-19 pandemic, ‘Botanical Fusion. Singapore to Dublin’ exhibition unexpectedly ended just days after the opening night. In response, Gerard Byrne Studio created accessible worldwide an innovative and interactive 360 degree virtual gallery tour of the exhibition. Launched on World Environment Day, 5 June 2020, as the first virtual experience offered by a privately owned art gallery in Ireland.

Artwork

Exhibitions

Solo exhibitions
 2021 Nov To the Sea Greenlane Gallery, Dingle, Ireland
 2020 Sep Pause for Harmony. Art in Lockdown 360 virtual exhibition, Gerard Byrne Studio, Dublin, Ireland
 2020 Sep – Oct Pause for Harmony. Art in Lockdown  Gerard Byrne Studio, Dublin, Ireland
 2020 Jun Botanical Fusion. Singapore to Dublin 360 virtual exhibition, Gerard Byrne Studio, Dublin, Ireland
 2020 Feb – Mar Botanical Fusion. Singapore to Dublin  Gerard Byrne Studio, Dublin, Ireland
 2019 Nov – Dec 30 Years in the Making, Gerard Byrne Studio, Dublin, Ireland
 2019 Aug – Nov Botanical Fusion People's Gallery, Singapore Botanic Gardens, Singapore
 2018 Jun Inside Outside & Beyond Gallery Space, National Botanic Gardens, Dublin, Ireland
 2018 Apr Time is The Enemy Gerard Byrne Studio, Dublin, Ireland
 2017 Nov Gallery Opening, Gerard Byrne Studio, Dublin, Ireland
 2016 May Artists Open Houses Festival The Gerard Byrne Studio, Brighton, United Kingdom
 2014 Dec Gerard Byrne Studio, Gerard Byrne Studio, Clerkenwell, London, United Kingdom
 2013 Nov Gerard Byrne Studio, Dalkey, Ireland
 2013 Jun ART House, Dalkey, Ireland
 2013 Feb ART House, Dalkey, Ireland
 2012 Jun ART House, Dalkey, Ireland
 2012 Dec ART House, Dalkey, Ireland
 2012 Aug ART House, Dalkey, Ireland
 2009 Gorry Gallery, Dublin
 2008 Greenlane Gallery, Dingle, Ireland 
 2007 Gallery 4, Dublin
 2006 Irish Fine Art, Dublin
 2005 Irish Fine Art, Dublin
 2004 Dalkey Arts Gallery, Dublin
 2003 Gorry Gallery, Dublin
 2001 Dalkey Arts Gallery, Dublin
 2000 Gorry Gallery, Dublin
 1998 Gorry Gallery, Dublin
 1997 Bridge Gallery, Dublin
 1996 Harrison Gallery, Dublin
 1995 Jo Rain Gallery, Dublin
 1995 Harrison Gallery, Dublin
 1994 Jo Rain Gallery, Dublin
 1994 Guinness Hop Store, Dublin
 1993 Fortune Society, New York City
 1992 Brown's Gallery, Dublin
 1991 George Gallery, Dublin
 1990 People's Gallery, Berlin
 1989 George Gallery, Dublin

Recent group exhibitions
 2018 Jun The New English Art Club, Annual Exhibition, Mall Galleries, London, United Kingdom
 2017 Jun SKY ARTS, Landscape Artist of the Year, Knaresborough Castle, Yorkshire, United Kingdom
 2017 Jun An Exhibition of 17th – 21st Century Irish Paintings, Gorry Gallery, Dublin, Ireland
 2017 Jul Pintar Rapido, Chelsea Town Hall, Chelsea, London, United Kingdom
 2016 Sep Pintar Rapido, Posthoornkerk, Haarlemmerstraat, Amsterdam, the Netherlands
 2016 Nov Naked Eye Gallery, Hove, United Kingdom
 2016 May Revolution Show, The Observer Building, Hastings, United Kingdom
 2016 May Future Nepal Charity Auction, UCS Hampstead, Hampstead, London, United Kingdom
 2016 Jun Alzheimer's in the Frame, The Memorable Icons, The Alzheimer's Show, Olympia, Kensington, London, United Kingdom
 2016 Jun Alzheimer's in the Frame, The Memorable Icons, Gallery Elena Shchukina, Mayfair, London, United Kingdom
 2016 Jul Pintar Rapido, Chelsea Town Hall, Chelsea, London, United Kingdom
 2016 Feb Parallax Art Fair, Chelsea Town Hall, Chelsea, London, United Kingdom
 2016 Dec Focus LDN Winter Exhibition, Menier Gallery, Southwark, London, United Kingdom
 2016 Apr Focus LDN The Art of Regeneration, Menier Gallery, Southwark, London, United Kingdom
 2015 Mar Clerkenwell Design Week, Platform, Clerkenwell, London, United Kingdom

Selected collections

 Irish Embassy, Beijing
 Irish Embassy, Singapore 
 Singapore Botanic Gardens 
 Department of the Marine 
 Department of Justice
 Office of Public Works (OPW) Ireland
 Electricity Supply Board
 Guinness plc
 O2 Ireland
 Deutsche Bank West LB
 Woodchester Bank
 Durkan Homes
 Corrigan & Corrigan (Solicitors)
 The Citadelle Art Museum, Texas, USA 
 Louis Walsh
 Paula Rowan 
 Maeve Binchy  and Gordon Snell
 Diarmuid Gavin and Justine Keane
 Sligo Park Hotel 
 Marlfield House 
 Ballymascanlon House Hotel 
 Finnegans Pub, Dalkey 
 Gresham Hotel, Dublin 
 Shelbourne Hotel, Dublin 
 Dylan Hotel, Dublin

References

External links

Artist's Pinterest Page
 No two journeys are ever the same video by Kirsten Kavendish (3:30 min) Brighton, March 2016
 Gerard Byrne at Pintar Rapido Plein Air Painting Competition London 2016 video by Henjo.tv (4 mins) London, July 2016
 Gerard Byrne at SKY Landscape Artist of The Year 2017 video (03:45 mins) Knaresborough Castle, June 2017
 Interview with Gerard Byrne. Focus LDN, July 2016 
 Meet the Artist Gerard Byrne. Naked Eye Gallery, Brighton, March 2017 
 Tale of two cities for artist Gerard Byrne, The Irish World, June 2018 
 Artistic License: Gerard Byrne, The Gloss, July 2018 
 Art of Darkness, Irish Times, 12 January 2019 
 Byrning Bright, Independent, 8 July 2019 
 Not Your Garden Variety Art, The Irish World, 14 August 2019 
 Botanical Fusion Singapore Botanic Gardens Exhibition, India Se Media, August 2019 
 Finglas Artist Gets Invite To Singapore, Dublin People, 30 August 2019 
 See inside the Ranelagh home and studio of Irish artist Gerard Byrne, Image, 5 September 2019 
 My Cultural Life, Independent, 22 September 2019 
 Ambassador Patrick Bourne, Embassy of Ireland Singapore, Department of Foreign Affairs, August 2018, 
 Nigel Taylor, Group Director of Singapore Botanic Gardens, 28 December 2015 
 Nigel Taylor, Group Director of Singapore Botanic Gardens, 28 December 2019 
 Singapore Botanic Gardens 
 Artists in the Gardens, Plural, 22 October 2019 
 Gerard Byrne appointed Artist-in-Residence at the Singapore Botanic Gardens, NewsFour, 27 October 2019 
 Royal Botanic Gardens Kew 
 National Botanic Gardens of Ireland 
 World Environment Day 

Irish Impressionist painters
Irish contemporary artists
Irish landscape painters
Irish still life painters
Flower artists
1958 births
Living people